South African Open may refer to:
South African Open (chess), a chess tournament held in South Africa
South African Open (golf), a golf tournament held in South Africa
 South African Open (tennis), a defunct tennis tournament played from 1891 to 1995
SA Tennis Open, a defunct tennis tournament played from 2009 to 2011